G.S. Singhvi (born 12 December 1948) is a retired judge of the Supreme Court of India. He retired on 11 December 2013.

Early life and education 
Justice Singhvi was born at Jodhpur, Rajasthan on 12 December 1948. He graduated in 1968 from Jodhpur University and earned Bachelor of Laws (LL.B.) degree in 1971 from Rajasthan University with gold medal.

Career

As a lawyer 
Justice Singhvi practised in Rajasthan High Court, mainly in Constitutional Law.

As a judge 
He became a judge of the Rajasthan High Court on 20 July 1990. was transferred to Punjab and Haryana High Court on 28 April 1994 and then to the Gujarat High Court on 28 February 2005.

He was elevated to the post of Chief Justice of Andhra Pradesh High Court on 27 November 2005. He became a judge of Supreme Court of India on 12 November 2007.

Notable judgements

2G spectrum case 

On 2 February 2012, a bench composed of Justice Singhvi and Justice AK Ganguly quashed 122 2G licenses issued in the year 2008 by A. Raja, then Union Telecom Minister terming them as "unconstitutional and arbitrary".

Vehicle beacon lights case 
Justice Singhvi headed a bench of Supreme Court dealing with abuse of vehicle beacon lights. During the hearings, the bench said, "A judge becomes hourable (sic) by his judgments and not by using red beacon at the top of his official car."  The bench ordered all the governments to take steps to limit the list of dignitaries entitled to use red beacon with siren on their official cars.

Suresh Kumar Koushal v. Naz Foundation 

A bench of justice GS Singhvi and justice SJ Mukhopadhaya has upheld the Section 377 of India's penal code bans "sex against the order of nature", which is widely interpreted to mean homosexual sex. The judges stated that "a miniscule [sic] fraction of the country's population constitutes lesbians, gays, bisexuals or transgenders" and that the High Court had erroneously relied upon international precedents "in its anxiety to protect the so-called rights of LGBT persons". The United Nations human rights chief Navi Pillay voiced her disappointment at the re-criminalization of consensual same-sex relationships in India, calling it "a significant step backwards" for the country and UN chief Ban Ki-moon stressed on the need for equality and opposed any discrimination against lesbians, gays and bisexuals.

The judgement was overturned by a larger constitutional bench on 6 September 2018.

2011 Greater Noida Industrial Development Authority 
In a judgement on 6 July 2011, the bench of Justice Singhvi along with Justice AK Ganguly ordered that entire 156 hectares of land be given back to the robbed farmers. The government had acquired the land for "development" but was handed over to builders for making commercial and residential complexes. The bench imposed a fine of  Greater Noida Industrial Development Authority (GNIDA) for its illegal act.

Quotes 
 "It is sad to say that my generation have failed the nation, and in a nation where 700 million people live below the poverty line we tend to talk about justice. We talk about our fundamental rights being trampled upon but what about those people who do not get two square meals a day, have no right to education, shelter, clothing and other basic amenities, and what about tribal people."
 Justice Singhvi speaking at a seminar in Guwahati, Assam on 12 May 2012.
 "The 'jan sevaks' are fast becoming our masters, the first citizens followed by the rich and the poor only as third class citizens"
 Justice Singhvi speaking at a seminar in Guwahati, Assam 12 May 2012.

References 

1948 births
Living people
Justices of the Supreme Court of India
People from Jodhpur
University of Rajasthan alumni
Judges of the Gujarat High Court
Chief Justices of the Andhra Pradesh High Court
20th-century Indian judges
21st-century Indian judges
Indian Jains

G.S. Singhvi is a part of the selection jury in Mahaveer Awards presented by Bhagwan Mahaveer Awards.